Eyetong is an Oron Village in Urue-Offong/Oruko local government area of Akwa Ibom state in Nigeria. Formed by the children of Otong.

References 

Places in Oron Nation
Villages in Akwa Ibom